Almost a Honeymoon is a 1930 play by Walter Ellis. It debuted at the Garrick Theatre in London and later enjoyed a successful run at the Apollo Theatre. A farce it concerns a young man who has secured a lucrative post in the colonial service. His problem is that the post requires him to be married, and he has just a day to find a woman to be his wife.

Original cast
Charles - Hylton Allen/George Relph
Bailiff - Christopher Steele
Basil Dibley - Gerald Pring
Cuthbert de Grey - Lamont Dickinson
Mr. Dixon - Edward Thane
Taxi Driver - Barry Lyndon
Margaret Brent - Grace Lane
Rosalie Quilter - Renee Kelly/Mercia Swinburne

Adaptations
The play was twice adapted for film. In 1930 Almost a Honeymoon directed by Monty Banks and starring Clifford Mollison and Dodo Watts and in 1938 Almost a Honeymoon directed by Norman Lee and starring Tommy Trinder and Linden Travers.

References

Bibliography
 Smith, Leslie. Modern British Farce. Barnes and Noble, 1989.

1930 plays
Comedy plays
British plays adapted into films
West End plays